Anna Solomon is an American novelist.

Prior to writing her first novel, she was a journalist for National Public Radio. She then received her MFA from the Iowa Writers Workshop. Her first book, the 2011 novel The Little Bride, is about the life of an orphaned, Jewish  girl from the Russian Pale of settlement who goes to a South Dakota farm as a mail order bride.

Her second novel is Leaving Lucy Pear, a story about a baby that has been abandoned in a pear orchard.

She is the two time recipient of the Pushcart Prize and the recipient of the Missouri Review Editor's Prize.

Solomon was born and raised in Gloucester, Massachusetts and lives in Brooklyn, New York along with her husband and two kids.

Books 

 The Little Bride (2011)
 Leaving Lucy Pear (2016)
 The Book of V. (2020)

References

Year of birth missing (living people)
Living people
21st-century American novelists
American women novelists
21st-century American women writers